Muhlaysia Booker (January 14, 1997 – May 18, 2019) was a 22 year old African American trans woman whose filmed assault in Dallas, Texas went viral on social media. She was murdered a month later.

Attack  
On April 12, 2019, Booker and a cousin went to see a fight in Royal Crest Apartments. Upon leaving, Booker backed into a car and tried to flee the scene. The driver got out of his car and held Booker at gunpoint until damages were paid. A crowd gathered around the altercation and Edward Thomas was offered $200 to assault Booker. Bystanders watched, videotaped, and yelled. The video was uploaded to social media and went viral. Booker had a concussion and fractured wrist. The Dallas mayor labeled it as "mob violence." On April 14, 2019, Edward Thomas was charged with aggravated assault and held without bond in Dallas County jail. The police stated that his ankle monitor placed him at the location. He was eventually bonded at $75,000 at his court hearing and went back to jail on May 20.

After Booker's attack, supporters held a small rally. Booker spoke out about assault against the transgender community. Her cousin, Quanjasmine Baccus, said, "She was picked on because she is transgender."

Murder 
At around 6:40 AM on May 18, 2019, police officers responded to reports of a shooting near Tenison Park Golf Course, where Booker was found dead from a gunshot wound. Kendrell Lyles, a 34-year old male, was arrested and charged with Booker's murder, as well as two other killings. Police said that earlier, Booker was seen getting into a light colored Lincoln, matching the description of Lyles' car. Police discovered phone records between Booker and Lyles, placing him in the area.

References 

1997 births
2019 deaths
Violence against trans women
Transgender women
LGBT African Americans
People murdered in Texas
LGBT people from Texas
People from Dallas
Deaths by firearm in Texas